is a Japanese footballer currently playing as a centre back for Shimizu S-Pulse.

Early life
Kikuchi joined Shimizu S-Pulse at the age of five.

Career statistics

Club
.

Notes

References

External links

2003 births
Living people
People from Shizuoka (city)
Association football people from Shizuoka Prefecture
Japanese footballers
Japan youth international footballers
Association football defenders
Shimizu S-Pulse players